George Stokell (22 October 1826 – 5 May 1898) was an Australian politician.

Stokell was born in Tasmania in 1826. In 1885 he was elected to the Tasmanian House of Assembly, representing the seat of Richmond. He served until 1886. He died in 1898 in Rokeby.

References

1826 births
1898 deaths
Members of the Tasmanian House of Assembly